Maurice Manasseh (born 12 January 1943) is a former English first-class cricketer who played for Middlesex and Oxford University from 1962 to 1967. He was born in Calcutta.

He is Chairman and Financial Adviser at Investors Planning Associates Ltd, and a member of the London Institute of Banking & Finance.

References

External links
 
 

1943 births
Living people
English cricketers
Middlesex cricketers
Cricketers from Kolkata
Oxford University cricketers
People educated at Epsom College
Alumni of Oriel College, Oxford